Aamon (also known as Amon and Nahum), in demonology, is a Grand Marquis of Hell who governs 40 infernal legions, and the 7th spirit of the Goetia. He is the demon of life and reproduction.

Description 
The names Aamon and Amon come from the god Amun or from the god Baal-hamon of Carthage. Nahum means "who induces to eagerness."

According to the Dictionnaire Infernal by Collin de Plancy, he commands 40 legions of demons and carries the title of Prince. He's also an entity many looked to reconcile friends and foes, and procure love for those seeking it. The Egyptians viewed Amon or Amun as their supreme God; they represented him with the blue skin, in a rather human form.

He was written about by Johann Wier in 1583 in the Pseudomonarchia daemonum.

"Amon, or Aamon, is a great and mighty marques, and commeth abroad in the likeness of a Wolf, having a serpents tail, [vomiting] flames of fire; when he putteth on the shape of a man, he sheweth out dogs teeth, and a great head like to a mighty [night hawk]; he is the strongest prince of all other, and understandeth of all things past and to come, he procureth favor, and reconcileth both friends and foes, and rule forthy legions of devils."

And much later by S. L. MacGregor Mathers in the Goetia.

"The Seventh Spirit is Amon. He is a Marquis great in power, and most stern. He appeareth like a Wolf with a Serpent's tail, vomiting out of his mouth flames of fire; but at the command of the Magician he putteth on the shape of a Man with Dog's teeth beset in a head like a Raven; or else like a Man with a Raven's head (simply). He telleth all things Past and to Come. He procureth feuds and reconcileth controversies between friends. He governeth 40 Legions of Spirits. His Seal is this which is to be worn as aforesaid, etc."

Harley MS 6483 of The Lesser Key of Solomon states that Amon can also enable the magician to summon and interrogate the spirits of those who drowned at sea.

References

Bibliography
 S. L. MacGregor Mathers, A. Crowley, The Goetia: The Lesser Key of Solomon the King, .
 Collin de Plancy, Dictionnaire Infernal
 The Lesser Key of Solomon
 Pseudomonarchia Daemonum
 "History of Witchcraft and Demonology" by Montague Summers
 "Biblical Demonology" by Merrill F. Unger
 "Demonology: The Hierarchies of Hell" by Michael Szul

External links
 Pseudomonarchia Daemonum

Goetic demons
Amun